Wang Qingyun (born November 9, 1983, in Harbin, China) is a Chinese former figure skater. She is the 1998 and 2002 Chinese national bronze medalist. Her highest placement at an ISU Championship was 18th at the 2002 Four Continents Championships. She placed 9th at the 1999 Asian Winter Games.

Results

External links
 
 Tracings.net profile

Chinese female single skaters
1983 births
Figure skaters from Harbin
Living people
Figure skaters at the 1999 Asian Winter Games